The BET Award for Best International Act: UK was an award given to honor the outstanding achievements of international artists from the United Kingdom every year. The category was retired in 2017 and incorporated into Best International Act: Europe.

Winners and nominees
Winners are listed first and highlighted in bold.

2010s

Multiple wins and nominations

Nominations
 2 nominations
 Estelle
 Krept and Konan
 Labrinth
 Rita Ora
 Emeli Sandé
 Skepta
 Stormzy
 Tinie Tempah

See also
 BET Award for Best International Act: Africa

References

BET Awards